Seikkula is a Finnish surname. Notable people with the surname include:

Cindy Seikkula (born 1958), American speed skater
Irma Seikkula (1914–2001), Finnish actress

Finnish-language surnames